Deira was an Anglo-Saxon kingdom in what is now Yorkshire, England.

Deira may also refer to:
 Deira, Dubai, an area of Dubai, United Arab Emirates
 Deira Islands, artificial islands in Deira, Dubai
 1244 Deira, an asteroid